Simo-Pekka Riikola (born 3 February 1992) is a retired Finnish professional ice hockey defenceman who played for many teams of the Finnish Liiga and for the Herning Blue Fox in Danish Metal Ligaen. His brother Juuso also played professionally.

He retired in January 2023 due to a serious knee injury.

References

External links

1992 births
Living people
Finnish ice hockey defencemen
KalPa players
Lukko players
SaiPa players
SaPKo players
HC TPS players
People from Joensuu
Sportspeople from North Karelia